Blastobasis crypsimorpha is a moth in the family Blastobasidae. It was described by Edward Meyrick in 1922. It is found in the Punjab region of what was British India.

References

Blastobasis
Moths described in 1922